Painters Hill is an unincorporated community in Flagler County, Florida, United States. It is located just north of Beverly Beach and southeast of Palm Coast on State Road A1A. The community is part of the Deltona–Daytona Beach–Ormond Beach, FL metropolitan statistical area.

References

Unincorporated communities in Flagler County, Florida
Unincorporated communities in Florida
Populated coastal places in Florida on the Atlantic Ocean
Former municipalities in Florida